
Aeaea, Ææa or Eëä (  or) was a mythological island said to be the home of the goddess-sorceress Circe.

In Homer's Odyssey, Odysseus tells Alcinous that he stayed here for one year on his way home to Ithaca. He says that he could not resist the need to be on this island, not so much for Circe but so that he does not resist the pull.

Before leaving Aeaea, Odysseus was given instructions by Circe about how to cross the ocean and assisted by the North Wind to reach the underworld:

Description
Homer describes Aeaea as covered with a mixture of pasture and dense woodland of oak and beech. There were high hills or bluffs from which the sea could be seen encircling the island in all directions. Circe's stone house was located in a "dense forest of trees" "in a place that could be seen from far."

Location

The somewhat inconsistent geography of Homer's Odyssey is often considered more mythic than literal, but the geography of the Alexandrian scholar and poet Apollonius of Rhodes is more specific. In his epic Argonautica, he locates the island somewhere south of Aethalia (Elba), within view of the Tyrrhenian shore (western coast of Italy). In the same poem, Aeëtes remarks on the great distance between Colchis and Aeaea in these terms:

Aeaea was later identified by classical Roman writers with Mount Circeo on Cape Circeo (Cape Circaeum) on the western coast of Italy—about 100 kilometers south of Rome—which may have looked like an island due to the marshes and sea surrounding its base but which is a small peninsula. It was already a peninsula according to Dionysius of Halicarnassus. However, it may have been still an island in the days of Homer, with a long "lido" or sandy peninsula that gradually became attached to the mainland, in a common geological process. Archeologists have identified one cave or grotto on the cape as "Grotta della Maga Circe", the cave of Circe. A second was found on the nearby Island of Ponza. It is believed that Circe had her summer home on Mount Circe and her winter home on Ponza, which may possibly be the island of Aeaea.

The modern Greek scholar Ioannis Kakridis insists that any attempt at realistic identification is in vain, arguing that Homer vaguely located Aeaea somewhere in the eastern part of his world, perhaps near Colchis, since Circe was the sister of Aeëtes, king of Colchis, and because their paternal aunt the goddess Eos had her palace there.

Other hypothetical locations
Robert Graves (The Greek Myths) identifies, as Aeaea, the island of Lošinj, near the Istrian peninsula in the north Adriatic Sea.

An author, Fernando Jaume, identified the “Island of Circe” with Didyme, that is, Salina, the “erratic rocks” being the “Faraglioni di Lipari”, next to the “Island of the Sirens” and the “ Hades in Sicily ”, perhaps as many evocations of the volcanism of this archipelago. The narrow beach, the forests dedicated to Persephone would be there, in Acquedolci

Tim Severin (The Ulysses Voyage) identifies, as Aeaea, the island of Paxos in the Ionian Sea near the Greek coast. The island is on the furthest west on a boundary between the sea and the river of Okeanos, which is said to encircle the earth. Drawing upon this interpretation, Assassin's Creed Odyssey uses a fictional atoll point off the coast of Paxos as the location.

Gaedl Lomen (The Sea in the Greek Imagination) identifies, as Aeaea the island of Cyprus, in the Eastern Mediterranean.

Aeaea in literature
In Richard Aldington's novel All Men are Enemies (1933), Aeaea is the island, "twelve hours from Naples" (obviously mythical), where his heroes meet, and love between them flourishes.

John Banville's 1993 novel Ghosts has a boating party shipwrecked on an unnamed island; one character, Sophie, speculates that it is Aeaea; another says, "Yes...yes, Aeaea: you will feel at home, no doubt", a reference to Sophie's Circean nature.

"Aeaean" was an epithet of Circe and her paternal niece Medea, who were the sister and daughter of Aeëtes, the ruler of Aea in Colchis  Circe's son Telegonus is likewise given this epithet.  It was also a name of Calypso, who was believed to have inhabited a small island of the name of Aeaea in the straits between Italy and Sicily.

References

Sources

Locations in Greek mythology
Geography of the Odyssey
Mythological islands
Circe